Acifran is a niacin receptor agonist.

References

Receptor agonists
Carboxylic acids
Enones